The Canongate Bridge is a pedestrian bridge in the Scottish Borders town of Jedburgh. It was built as the town's main bridge over the Jed Water in the 16th century. Since 1971 it has been a category A listed building.

Description
The Canongate Bridge is a 16th-century stone arch bridge that crosses Jed Water in the centre of Jedburgh. The viaduct is built of cream-coloured sandstone and it spans the river with three arches, one of which normally runs over land. The passageway is up to three meters wide. The bridge said to be in desperate need of repair in 1677 and 1770 and repairs took place in 1772.

The Canongate Bridge was built as a road bridge and it has refuges where pedestrians can stand safely whilst heavy traffic passed. The bridge was the main access into the town but it has been closed to motorised traffic for some years.

The bridge is now within the town's conservation area and many of the surrounding buildings are listed. At one end is Duck Row and the Piper's House and at the other the houses of Bridge End.

Flooding
The Jed Water is liable to flood, so the river levels are monitored near the bridge. The depth is usually between 0.37 and 2.33 metres deep but it has been as deep as 3.5m which it reached in January 2016. In 2020 there was a problem when the flood defences near the bridge were breached by debris in one storm just before another storm hit. Luckily repairs were made and serious flooding was avoided.

References

External links

Jedburgh
Bridges in the Scottish Borders
16th-century establishments in Scotland
Bridges completed in the 16th century
Category A listed buildings in the Scottish Borders
Listed bridges in Scotland